Russell or Russ Smith may refer to:

Sports
Russ Smith (guard) (1893–1958), American football player
Russ Smith (running back) (1944–2001), American football player
Russ Smith (basketball) (born 1991), American basketball player
Russell Smith (canoeist) (active since 1987), British slalom canoer
Russell Smith (referee) (active since 1990), rugby league referee

Law and politics
Russell Evans Smith (1908–1990), US federal judge
Russell Smith (Australian politician) (born 1946), Australian politician
Russell Smith (New York politician) (1822–1866), New York politician

Media and the arts
Russell Smith (writer) (born 1963), South African-born Canadian novelist and nonfiction writer
Russell Smith (producer) (active since 1998), American film producer
Russell Smith (singer) (1949–2019), American country music singer-songwriter
Russ Smith (publisher) (born 1955), American newspaper publisher
Russell Smith (trumpeter) (1890–1966), American jazz musician

Others
J. Russell Smith (1874–1966), American geographer
H. Russell Smith (1914–2014), American business executive
Russell L. Smith Retired American sailor, 15th Master Chief Petty Officer of the Navy
Russell Lee Smith (1947–1975), American spree killer